Gam Ngan Gei (born 3 August 1947), better known as Jin Yinji, is a Singaporean actress of South Korean descent. She was prominently a full-time Mediacorp artiste from 1986 to 2017, and subsequently continued to film on an ad-hoc basis.

Early life 
Jin Yinji was born in South Korea, and had 10 other siblings.

Career

Singer 
When Jin was 17 (1964–65), she left South Korea to find her two elder sisters in Taiwan. As she was interested in singing, she participated in a singing competition and came in second. She decided to make singing her occupation in Taiwan. Later in March 1972, Jin went to Singapore to further her career.

Actress 
In 1986, Jin made her acting debut in Neighbours. Later, Jin was nominated for a popularity award, Top 10 Most Popular Female Artistes in Star Awards 2004 as she acted in numerous drama serials for the past two years. After 11 years of veteran acting, Jin was finally nominated for Best Supporting Actress in Star Awards 2013 for her role in It Takes Two and managed to be one of the lead actresses in a 2015 family drama series, Super Senior.

Jin's contract with Mediacorp was due to expire in February 2017. She was allegedly told to take a pay cut and was compared to a "$50-an-hour bit player." She later clarified that the remark was made over 10 years ago and has since settled the fiasco with Mediacorp with details of her new contract unknown.

In 2017, Jin was involved in 2 dramas The Lead & My Teacher Is a Thug. In 2018, Jin was involved in a few dramas Life Less Ordinary, Fifty & Fabulous & Magic Chef. Jin's contract with Mediacorp expired in February 2017. 

In Star Awards 2018, Jin won her first Top 10 Most Popular Female Artistes award after being nominated but failed to win any after several years. In 2019, she was involved in dramas Heart To Heart , Hello From The Other Side, Dear Neighbours & All is Well- Singapore where she played as Elvin Ng's grandmother, she will be acting in a new drama, After The Stars.

Other career 
In 2020, Jin started selling home made kimchi with her Korean daughter-in-law Cloe Han from their home.

Personal life 
On 27 January 1972, Jin married Anthony Lee, a Singaporean antique dealer. Jin has two children, a son and a daughter. Originally a South Korean citizen, Jin was naturalised as a Singaporean citizen when she was 26 (1973–74).

Filmography

Awards and nominations

Notes

References

Living people
Singaporean people of Korean descent
Singaporean television actresses
1947 births
21st-century Singaporean actresses
South Korean emigrants to Singapore
Naturalised citizens of Singapore